Kentucky Route 338 (KY 338) is a  state highway in Kentucky. It begins at KY 20 in Northern Boone County. It goes through Burlington, Kentucky where it intersects with KY 18. It then goes to a small town called Rabbit Hash, Kentucky where it intersects with KY 536 and again with KY 18. After it leaves Rabbit Hash, it runs by Big Bone Lick State Park before intersecting with U.S. Route 42 (US 42) and US 127 near Union. It turns left onto US 42 and US 127, and then leaves the concurrency about mile north. KY 338 then travels to Richwood, where it has access to Interstate 75 (I-75) and I-71 it ends about 1/4 mile east of the interstate at US 25.

Major Junctions

References

0338
Transportation in Boone County, Kentucky